John Wilson was the Anglicized name of Captain Frederick Walgren, (8 July 1851-5 August 1899)  a Swedish sailor and o-yatoi gaikokujin (foreign professional) who was active in the development of British-Japanese ties in the late 19th century. 

Walgren was born in Genarp, Skåne, Sweden on 8 July 1851. He entered into British service, changing his name to Wilson. Wilson initially resided in Nagasaki, Kyūshū, living next-door to Thomas Blake Glover. The Wilson family subsequently resided in Nagasaki and Kobe. He married a Japanese national on 11 January 1883 at Christ Church, Yokohama, the Anglican church located in Yamate, overlooking the Port of Yokohama, Japan. His wife (b. 5 July 1860) upon baptism Anglicised her name from Naka Yamazaki to Sophia Wilson, and adopted her son, Nils Wilson. Their children were August, Frederick, Maria, Christina, Hilda, Hannah and John.

Sofia Wilson was a confidant and neighbor of Tsuru Glover, the Japanese wife of Thomas Glover, and together with Tsuru's friendship with the Japanese Ambassador to Italy, the stories of Naka and Tsuru may have been incorporated in Giacomo Puccini's Madam Butterfly.

Naval Service of Japan 

Captain Wilson was appointed Master of the First Grade to the Meiji Emperor.  He was instrumental in the service of Japan during the First Sino-Japanese War. He was captain of the Sei-Kyo Maru, a transport ship and was involved in the Battle of Yalu (Battle of the Yellow Sea on 17 September 1894, carrying Vice-Admiral Kabayama Sukenori, chief of the Naval General Staff of Japan.  The Sei-Kyo Maru was hit by four 12-inch shells, lost the protection of the main body of the fleet during the engagement, and was attacked by torpedo boats.  She was saved from sinking and escaped from battle due to the naval expertise of Captain Wilson. This escape from battle made history, and became famous in Japanese Naval Military lore.

Recognition by Meiji Emperor 

For these and other heroic naval exploits, including a daring rescue of a ship during stormy seas, John Wilson received recognition from the Meiji Emperor of Japan, and received the sixth rank of the Japanese Order of the Rising Sun at the Imperial Palace in Edo on 25 December  1895.

Later life in Japan 

Captain Wilson was active in the formation of Westernized Japanese firms, including the NYK (Nippon Yusen Kaisha) shipping firm of Japan, and is commemorated in the NYK Maritime Museum in Yokohama. His descendants remained in Japan for several generations, residing in Kobe, Yokohama and Tokyo. Several descendants who retained Swedish citizenship later repatriated to Sweden after World War II, where they resided in Gothenburg, Sweden and the United States.

Wilson died on 5 August 1899 of stomach cancer in Yokohama.  Wilson and his wife are buried in the Yokohama Foreign Cemetery on Yokohama Bluff, a gaijin bochi, which lies in a residential area for the gaijin, or foreigners (外人), within Yokohama, where his granddaughter, Vivienne Joy Wilson Vaughn is also buried.  His gravestone is marked with the compass and angle, a traditional mark of Freemasonry.

Descendants
Captain Wilson's descendants entered into both Japanese and European culture.  His stepson Nils adopted the Uzuki name and became Japanized, as did August, who became Aneshama, and Frederick, who took the family name of Asakoshi.  Several of his later children became Europeanized, Maria marrying Marcel Van Lerberghe, a correspondent for Le Matin in Tokyo; his daughter Christina married the military attaché of the Russian Embassy Wsevolov Schalfeiyeff.  His youngest son, John Wilson Jr. (professor) was a professor of commerce and business in Tokyo, Japan.

A great-granddaughter of Captain John Wilson, Marianne Wilson (born Mary Ann Vaughn) was the subject of a highly controversial and widely reported case in international family law, Sweden v. Yamaguchi, decided in the Tokyo High Court in 1956. (See Judicial system of Japan, Kasumigaseki District of Tokyo)

References 
Search for Madame Butterfly

1851 births
1899 deaths
Japan–United Kingdom relations
People in Kyushu
Swedish expatriates in Japan
British expatriates in Japan
Deaths from stomach cancer